Hypermiling is driving or flying a vehicle with techniques that maximize fuel efficiency. Those who use these techniques are called "hypermilers". In the case of cars, this is an extreme form of energy-efficient driving.

Hypermiling can be practiced in any vehicle regardless of fuel consumption. It gained popularity due to the rise in gasoline prices in the 2000s. Some hypermiling techniques are illegal in some countries because they are dangerous. In 2008, the New Oxford American Dictionary voted "hypermiling" the best new word of the year.

Safety and awareness program
Hypermiling has come under fire from several sides because some hypermilers show dangerous or illegal behaviour, such as tailgating larger vehicles on motorways to save fuel, cycling between accelerating and coasting in neutral, and even turning the engine off when its power is not needed. For this reason, the Hypermiling Safety Foundation was established in August 2008 to promote a safety and education program that promotes legal fuel-saving techniques.

Hypermiling with electric cars
The range of some electric cars are limited. To get maximum out of the battery, drivers sometimes use hypermiling. Some try to get a new record with one charging of battery. For example, a Tesla Model 3 ran more than 1000 km with one battery charge. The average speed was 38 km/h and the whole drive took around 30 hours. The tester used the autopilot of Tesla Model 3, running the car unmanned. The test car did not drive on a public road.

Hypermiling with aircraft
There have been several aircraft hypermiling competitions held throughout the years, such the FuelVenture and CAFE challenges.  Klaus Savier won the 2009 Fuelventure 400 in a VariEze aircraft which got 45 MPG at 207 MPH with a modified Continental O-200 engine upgraded with a computerized fuel injection and ignition system by Light Speed Engineering.  By slowing to extend range, mileage approaches 100 miles per gallon.

See also
 Fuel economy in automobiles
 Rat running
 Energy-efficient driving

References

External links 
 

Driving techniques
Energy conservation